Abílio Filipe Antunes Teixeira, known as Tanela (born 15 October 1988) is a Portuguese football player who plays for Dumiense/CJP II.

Club career
He made his professional debut in the Segunda Liga for Varzim on 9 December 2015 in a game against Santa Clara.

References

1988 births
Sportspeople from Braga
Living people
Portuguese footballers
Merelinense F.C. players
Varzim S.C. players
Vilaverdense F.C. players
Liga Portugal 2 players
Association football forwards